The Indian Union Muslim League (abbreviated as the I. U. M. L. or the League) is an Indian political party primarily based in the Indian state of Kerala. It is recognised as a State Party in Kerala by the Election Commission of India.

The first Council of the Indian segment of the Muslim League was held on 10 March 1948 at the south Indian city of Madras (now Chennai). The 'Indian Union Muslim League' constitution was passed on 1 September 1951.

The party is a major member of the opposition United Democratic Front, the Indian National Congress-led pre-poll state level alliance in Kerala. Whenever the United Democratic Front rules in Kerala, the party leaders are chosen as important Cabinet Ministers. The party has always had a constant, albeit small, presence in the Indian Parliament. The party is a part of the United Progressive Alliance in national level. The League first gained a ministry (Minister of State for External Affairs) in Indian Government in 2004.

The party currently has four members in Parliament - E. T. Mohammed Basheer, M. P. Abdussamad Samadani and K. Navas Kani in the Lok Sabha and P. V. Abdul Wahab in the Rajya Sabha - and fifteen members in Kerala State Legislative Assembly.

History 

After the partition of India in 1947, the All-India Muslim League was virtually disbanded. It was succeeded by the Indian segment of the Muslim League in the new Dominion of India (first session on 10 March 1948 and constitution passed on 1 September 1951). M. Muhammad Ismail, the then President of the Madras Muslim League (M. M. L.) was chosen as the Convener of the Indian segment of the League. The Travancore League (the States' Muslim League) was merged with the Malabar League in November, 1956.

Indian Union Muslim League contests General Elections under the Indian Constitution. The party is normally represented by two members in the Indian Lower House (the Lok Sabha). B. Pocker, elected from Malappuram Constituency, was a member of the First Lower House (1952–57) from the Madras Muslim League (M. M. L.). The party currently has four members in Parliament.

Apart from Kerala and West Bengal, the League had Legislative Assembly members in Tamil Nadu, Pondicherry, Maharastra, Karnataka, Uttar Pradesh, and Assam. In West Bengal, the League had won Assembly seats in the 1970s, and A. K. A. Hassanussaman was a member of the Ajoy Mukherjee cabinet.

Indian Union Muslim League first gained a ministry in Kerala Government as part of the Communist Party of India Marxist-led United Front in 1967. The party switched fronts in 1969 and formed an alliance with the Congress in 1976. It later became a chief constituent in a succession of Indian National Congress-led ministries.

Early years 
First Council of the Indian segment of the Muslim League was held on 10 March 1948 at the south Indian city of Madras (now Chennai).
On 1 September 1951 the 'Indian Union Muslim League' came into being in Madras (constitution was passed).
B. Pocker Sahib, elected from Malappuram Constituency, was a member of the first Lok Sabha (1952–57).
K. M Seethi Sahib served as the Speaker of the Kerala Assembly from 1960 to 1961.

From the 1960s to the 80s 
The League gained a ministry in Kerala Government in 1967 (C. H. Mohammed Koya and M. P. M. Ahammed Kurikkal).
The League oversaw the creation of the University of Calicut, the second university in Kerala, in 1968.
 Contribution to local government - the League oversaw the creation of Malappuram District in 1969.
Death of M. Muhammad Ismail (1972) and Bafaqy Thangal (1973). Syed Ummer Bafaqy Thangal rebels against the leadership.

With the Congress Party 
Muslim League formed an alliance with the Congress in 1976. 
C. H. Mohammed Koya served as the Chief Minister of Kerala from 12 October to 1 December 1979.
Muslim League joined the Congress (Indira)-lead United Democratic Front in 1979/80.
The 'rebel' Muslim League formed 'All India Muslim League' and joined the Left Front in 1980.
C. H. Mohammed Koya and K. Avukaderkutty Naha served as Deputy Chief Ministers of Kerala in the 1980s.

In the 1990s 
All India Muslim League (AIML) quit the Left Front and merged with the Muslim League in 1985.
Demolition of the Babri Masjid (1992). Panakkad Syed Mohammed Ali Shihab Thangal made a passionate plea to all the Muslims in Kerala to remain calm. Kerala remained peaceful throughout.
Ebrahim Sulaiman Sait, then National President, rebelled and formed the Indian National League (INL) in 1994.
Minister of Education (E. T. Mohammad Basheer) decided to establish the University of Sanskrit (1993) in Kerala.

From the 2000s 
Atal Bihari Vajpayee dispatched E. Ahamed to the United Nations (Geneva) to represent India (2004).
Mid-2000s witnessed the Manjeri (2004) and the Kuttippuram-Mankada (2006) defeats.
The League first gained a ministry (E. Ahamed) in Indian Government (Manmohan Singh Ministry) in 2004.
Panakkad Syed Mohammed Ali Shihab Thangal died in 2009.
The League won a record 20 out of the contested 23 seats in the 2011 Assembly Elections.
The League remains in the Opposition for two consecutive terms (2016 and 2021)

National Presidents of Indian Union Muslim League

Ideology

Composition

Organizational structure 
 Youth Wing: Muslim Youth League (the Youth League) 
National President: Asif Ansari (New Delhi)
National Secretary: Faisal Babu (Kerala)
Kerala State President: Sayyid Munavvar Ali Shihab Thangal
Kerala State General Secretary: P. K. Firoz
Students' Wing: Muslim Students Federation (M. S. F.)
National President: P.V. Ahamed Saju 
National General Secretary: S. H. Muhammed Arshad
 Scheduled Caste Wing: Indian Union Dalit League
 Women's Political Wing: M. S. F Haritha and Muslim Women's League
 Trade Union Organization (Kerala): Swathanthra Thozhilali Union (S. T. U., Independent Workers Union)
 Peasants' Union (Kerala): Swathanthra Karshaka Sangam (Independent Peasants Union)
 Advocates: Lawyers Forum
 Expatriates: Kerala Muslim Cultural Centre (K. M. C. C.)

Kerala Legislative Assembly 
Source: http://www.ceo.kerala.gov.in/electionhistory.html

Early years (1957 - 1979/80)

With the United Democratic Front (1979/80 - present)

Current members

Members of Parliament

Loksabha 
Source: Loksabha

Rajya Sabha 
Source: Rajyasabha

Controversies

The judicial commission which probed the 2002 Marad massacre concluded that IUML was directly involved in the conspiracy and execution of the massacre.

Political activities
The Muslim League has opposed the Supreme Court of India verdict regarding entry of adult women to Sabarimala temple. It is also at odds with several LGBTQ rulings from the Supreme Court. The party also supports the primacy of Muslim Personal Law among Indian Muslims.

IUML opposes implementing gender neutrality and comprehensive sex education in school curriculum saying that it promotes homosexuality, leads to sexual anarchy and is part of an atheist-liberal conspiracy to destroy religious values.

An article by the current president of the Muslim League, on Hagia Sophia, seemed to support the views of political Islam.

Muslim League generally presents itself as a patriarchal and conservative political party in Kerala. This was evident from a recent controversy involving the women's youth wing of the party.

References

External links 

 

 
Political parties established in 1948
Political parties established in 1951
Muslim League
Muslim League breakaway groups
Islamic political parties in India
Islam in Kerala
1948 establishments in India
Conservative parties in India